The Arsalyn Program of Ludwick Family Foundation (formerly Arsalyn Foundation) is a small 501(c)(3) non-profit foundation in the United States headquartered in Glendora, California. It is dedicated to increasing youth civic engagement.  It is categorized under Voter Education/Registration programs

Arsalyn Program's mission statement:

The Arsalyn Program of Ludwick Family Foundation was created to encourage young Americans to become informed and active participants in the electoral process.  The Arsalyn Program views the civic and political engagement of young people as beneficial to country, community and character.  The Arsalyn Program is firmly committed to a non-partisan, non-issue-based and inclusive approach to ensure that voting become a lifetime commitment on the part of our nation's young adults.

Speakers
Arsalyn Foundation hosts a variety of events, including town halls in Southern California and a national conference in Washington, D.C., with many different speakers.  Previous speakers at events have included:
Amy Alkon
Peter Beinart, editor-at-large of The New Republic
Andrei Cherny, a speechwriter for Vice president Al Gore
Judy Chu
Fenton Communications
Martin Frost
Nick Gillespie, former editor of Reason Magazine
Jonah Goldberg, editor at large of National Review Online
Amy Holmes
Phil Huckelberry, co-chair of the Green Party (United States)
John P. McConnell, a speechwriter for President George W. Bush
William Powers, a journalist with Atlantic Monthly
Eugene Robinson, journalist
Matthew Scully
Cathy Seipp
Matt Welch, former assistant editorial page editor of the Los Angeles Times and current editor of Reason Magazine

References

External links
Official website

Charities based in California
Community organizations
Voting
Socialization
Voter_turnout_organizations
Youth organizations based in California